The 1971 LSU Tigers football team represented Louisiana State University during the 1971 NCAA University Division football season.

Schedule

Roster

Team players drafted into the NFL

References

LSU
LSU Tigers football seasons
Sun Bowl champion seasons
LSU Tigers football